Herpetocetus is a genus of cetotheriid mysticete in the subfamily Herpetocetinae.

Taxonomy 
There are four recognized species of Herpetocetus: H. scaldiensis, H. transatlanticus, H. bramblei, and H. morrowi. An additional unnamed species from Japan has been referred to the nomen dubium Mizuhoptera sendaicus in the past, but the undiagnostic nature of the holotype of the latter means that it cannot be confidently referred to M. sendaicus.

Survival into the Pleistocene 
A recently discovered specimen of Herpetocetus from the Lower-Middle Pleistocene (Gelasian) Falor Formation of northern California indicates that Herpetocetus survived into the early Pleistocene, shedding light on the diversity of mysticetes in the early Pleistocene. Since other cetotheriids became extinct by the end of the Neogene, it's therefore possible that some Pliocene representatives of Cetotheriidae made it into the Pleistocene to co-exist with extant mysticete species.

References

External links 
 https://www.sciencedaily.com/releases/2013/04/130404122106.htm

Baleen whales
Pliocene cetaceans
Prehistoric mammals of North America
Fossil taxa described in 1872
Prehistoric cetacean genera